= Marc Wold =

American biochemist

Marc S. Wold is an American biochemist currently at University of Iowa and an Elected Fellow of the American Association for the Advancement of Science. His research interests are eukaryotic cells and DNA and his high citations for this field is 1254, 547 and 471.
